Libermorro Futebol Clube, commonly known as Libermorro, is a Brazilian football club based in Manaus, Amazonas.

History
The club was founded on December 7, 1947. They won the Torneio Início in 1984.

Achievements
 Torneio Início:
 Winners (1): 1984

Stadium
Libermorro Futebol Clube play their home games at Estádio Roberto Simonsen, commonly known as SESI. The stadium has a maximum capacity of 5,000 people. Until July 2010, the club played their home games at Vivaldão. Vivaldão had a maximum capacity of 31,000 people.

References

Football clubs in Amazonas (Brazilian state)
Association football clubs established in 1947
1947 establishments in Brazil